This list contains notable people who have been killed in traffic collisions. This list does not include those who were killed competing on closed road events whether in motorsport or in competitive cycling events. Passengers of a vehicle are indicated in parentheses on the "mode of transport" field.

A

B

C

D

E

F

G

H

I

J

K

L

M

N

O

P

Q

R

S

T

U

V

W

Y

Z

See also
List of deaths by motorcycle accident
List of professional cyclists who died during a race
List of racing drivers who died in racing crashes
Lists of people by cause of death

References

 
 

traffic collision
traffic collision